Bill Clinton served as the 42nd president of the United States from 1993 to 2001. Before that, he was the governor of Arkansas, and afterwards he has continued life in the public eye. He received many awards and honors throughout his career.

National honors

Foreign honors
{| class="wikitable" style="width:65%;"
! style="width:20%;"| Country
! style="width:20%;"| Date
! style="width:55%;"| Decoration
! style="width:5%;"| Post-nominal letters
|-
|  || 1998 || Grand Cross of the Order of Good Hope || 
|-
|  || 3 December 2006 || Grand Companion of the Order of Logohu<ref>{{cite web |title=It's now 'Chief Bill Clinton |url=https://www.upi.com/Top_News/2006/12/03/Its-now-Chief-Bill-Clinton/UPI-99431165188768/ |website=UPI |date=3 December 2006 |access-date=4 October 2022 |language=en}}</ref> || GCL
|-
|  || 19 June 2013 || President's Medal ||
|-
|  || 11 June 2019 || Order of Freedom || 
|-
|}

Scholastic

 Chancellor, visitor, governor, rector and fellowships

Honorary degrees

 Other awards and honors 
Multiple schools have been named after Clinton, and many statues in his honor have been erected, including one in Kosovo. The Clinton Presidential Center was opened in Little Rock, Arkansas in his honor on December 5, 2001. He has been honored in various other ways, in countries that include 
the Czech Republic, New Guinea,
Germany, and 
Kosovo.
U.S. states where he has been honored include Missouri, Arkansas, Kentucky, and New York. 

In 1993, Clinton was selected as Time magazine's "Man of the Year", and again in 1998, along with Ken Starr. From a poll conducted of the American people in December 1999, Clinton was among eighteen included in Gallup's List of Widely Admired People of the 20th century.

In 2000, Princeton University's American Whig-Cliosophic Society awarded him the James Madison Award for Distinguished Public Service. In 2001, Clinton received the NAACP's President's Award.

In 2004, he received a Grammy Award for Best Spoken Word Album for Children for narrating the Russian National Orchestra's album Wolf Tracks and Peter and the Wolf (along with Mikhail Gorbachev and Sophia Loren) and 2005 Grammy Award for Best Spoken Word Album for My Life. In 2005, he received the J. William Fulbright Prize for International Understanding, and 2007 TED Prize (named for the confluence of technology, entertainment and design).

In 2005 he received the Freedom Medal of the Four Freedoms Award.

On June 2, 2007, Clinton, along with former president George H.W. Bush, received the International Freedom Conductor Award, for their help with the fund raising following the tsunami that devastated South Asia in 2004. On June 13, 2007, Clinton was honored by the Global Business Coalition on HIV/AIDS, Tuberculosis and Malaria alongside eight multinational-companies for his work to defeat HIV/AIDS.

On September 9, 2008, Bill Clinton was named as the next chairman of the National Constitution Center in Philadelphia, Pennsylvania. His term began January 1, 2009, and he succeeded former President George H. W. Bush.

On March 15, 2011, Bill Clinton was inducted into Irish America magazine's Irish America Hall of Fame for his crucial role in the Northern Ireland Peace Process.

In 2012, a fish species was named after him, the beaded darter (Etheostoma clinton''), for his lasting environmental accomplishments in creating and expanding national monuments, preserving millions of acres of wilderness areas, his leadership and commitment during challenging economic times, and his continued commitment to global humanitarian issues and needs and peace.

In April 2013, Bill Clinton was named the inaugural recipient of the honorary Advocate for Change GLAAD Media Award for his record of promoting tolerance of the LGBT community, including advocating for marriage equality in New York in 2011, advocating against Amendment 1 in North Carolina in 2012, and calling for the Supreme Court of the United States to strike down the Defense of Marriage Act in 2013.

In March 2015, Bill Clinton was listed among the 10 recipients of the maiden edition of Global Seal of Integrity (GSOI) Honors list. An annual list by two young Nigerians,   dedicated at promoting trust and honesty for the well-being of the universe.

In March 2018, Belfast City Council voted in favour of awarding Bill Clinton, the Freedom of Belfast, due to his work during the Northern Ireland Peace Process.

References

Bill Clinton-related lists
Clinton